A college is an educational institution or a constituent part of an educational institution.

College may also refer to:

Groups
 College (canon law), a collection of persons to form one body
 College (corporation), an incorporated body of persons
 College of Bishops, the body of all bishops of the Catholic Church
 College of Cardinals, the body of all cardinals of the Catholic Church
 College of Pontiffs, a body of the ancient Roman state
 College of War, a state institution of the Russian Empire in charge of military affairs
 College (division), a division of a higher education institution focusing on related subject areas
 Electoral college, electors who are selected to elect a candidate to a particular office

Places
 College, Alaska, a census-designated place in Fairbanks North Star Borough, Alaska
 College (Preston ward), an electoral ward and district of Preston, Lancashire, England
 College, an electoral ward in Southwark, Greater London, England
 College (TTC), a subway station in Toronto, Ontario, Canada

Arts, entertainment, and media 
 College (1927 film), a comedy-drama silent film starring Buster Keaton
 College (1984 film), an Italian film
 College (2008 film), a comedy
 College (television series), a 1990 Italian TV series
 "College" (30 Rock), the eighth episode of the fifth season
 "College" (The Sopranos), the fifth episode of the first season
 College (musical project), an electronica music project by David Grellier
 College (cartoon), a 1931 Walter Lantz cartoon

See also
 
 
 
 Collage (disambiguation)